Büchenbach is a municipality in the district of Roth, in Bavaria, Germany.

History
During the Thirty Years' War the population decreased very sharp. Later protestant refugees came from Austria. In 1886 the train station was opened. In 1913 electricity was installed. In 1939 Büchenbach had 705 inhabitants. After 1945 refugees came to Büchenbach, so in 1962 there were 2200 inhabitants.

References

Roth (district)